Kodiak is the second level leadership development course for Venturers in the Boy Scouts of America's Venturing program.

Introduction to Leadership Skills for Crews is recommended but not required. Kodiak is the second course in the overall Venturing youth leadership development program called Nature of Leadership. When it was first being developed, Kodiak was being offered as Nature of Leadership Treks.

This training is one of several programs available within the youth leadership training program. Participants must complete unit-level training, National Youth Leadership Training or a special bridge course that has not yet been defined.  This training is an element of the overall leadership training program.

Kodiak
Kodiak is presented in a six-day (or 2 weekend) trek-oriented course.  It may be conducted by a crew by a District or by a local Council.  Because it is offered in a trek-format, Kodiak can be incorporated into a long-term high adventure trip by a crew.  It is not intended to be offered as a camp-based retreat format.

Kodiak covers seven basic leadership concepts:
 Values and Vision
 Planning
 Communication
 Effective Teams
 Inclusiveness
 Ethical Decision Making
 Servant Leadership

The first two concepts (Values and Planning) are covered before the trek, and the last five are covered, one per day, during the trek.

Completion of the course is recognized by the presentation of the Kodiak medal, which is worn on the left pocket.  As Kodiak is a youth course, adults should not wear the medal unless they are promoting a Kodiak course they are involved with.

Kodiak X 
Kodiak X was a weekend course put on by local councils, which uses leadership challenges to reinforce the skills learned in Kodiak, and introduces two new leadership commissions.  It is intended to be offered at a camp, in a retreat/activity format.  To participate in a Kodiak X course, the participant needs to have already completed a Kodiak course.

Kodiak X added the following leadership concepts:
 Evaluating Performance
 Mentoring

Completion of the course is (was) recognized by the presentation of the Kodiak X medal, which is worn on the left pocket.  As Kodiak X is a youth course, adults should not wear the medal unless they are promoting a Kodiak X course they are involved with.

Kodiak X in its original form was retired in 2011. Evaluating Performance is being rolled into all training and Mentoring is now its own course for Venturing. As of 2015 there is not an official syllabus and recognition metals and patches are no longer available from the Scout stores.

Kodiak/Kodiak X Course Director Course
BSA National offers a Course Director Course for those adults wishing to put on Kodiak/Kodiak X courses for their crews or in their local councils.  Currently, this course is offered in a week-long format at Philmont Training Center and at the Florida Sea Base Conference Center, and in a weekend format at the regional level.  While attendance at this CDC is not required to offer a Kodiak or Kodiak X course, it is encouraged.  Attendance at this CDC may be required in the future to offer a Kodiak /Kodiak X course, however.

References

Leadership training of the Boy Scouts of America